The Ministry of Social Affairs (MAS), since 2020 known as Ministry of Social Rights and 2030 Agenda, is a department of the Government of Spain responsible for the government policies on social services, family, minors protection, disability and prevention of youth crime, adoptions and foster care and the promotion of cultural communication and youth association. Likewise, the department is responsible for the government policies on animal welfare and UN Sustainable Development Goals.

The current minister is Ione Belarra, who was appointed on 31 March 2021.

History 
The department was created in 1988 during the premiership of Felipe González and assumed powers from the Ministry of Labour and Social Security, the National Institute for Social Services, the Ministry of Culture and the Ministry of Justice. In 1996, the new prime minister José María Aznar abolished the department and transferred its competences to the Ministry of Labour and Social Affairs.

During its first period of live, the department assumed powers relating social services, equality, minors protection and prevention of youth crime, adoptions and foster care and the promotion of cultural communication and youth association. Likewise, the department was responsible for the management of the social programs derived from funds obtained through the personal income tax and in its later years from the government migration policy.

The department was re-established in January 2020 by prime minister Pedro Sánchez.

Organization chart

Current structure 
The current structure is:

 The Secretariat of State for Social Rights.
The Directorate-General for Children and Adolescents Rights.
The Directorate-General for Family Diversity and Social Services.
The Directorate-General for Disability Support Policies.
 The Secretariat of State for 2030 Agenda.
The Directorate-General for Lever Policies for Compliance with the 2030 Agenda.
The Undersecretariat of Social Rights and 2030 Agenda.
The Technical General Secretariat.
The Directorate-General for Animal Rights.

Ministry agencies 

 Royal Board on Disability
 Institute for the Elderly and Social Services
 Institute of Youth
 Spanish Agency for Food Security and Nutrition

1988 structure 
The original structure, created in 1988, was:

 Undersecretariat of Social Affairs.
 Technical Directorate-General and for Services.
 Directorate-General for Social Action.
 Directorate-General for Legal Protection of Minors.

In addition, the government agencies Institute of Women, Institute of Youth and the National Institute for Social Services were attached to the department.

In 1993, the ministry assumed powers over emigrants and immigrants through the Directorate-General for Migrations and, in 1994, the Directorate-General for Legal Protection of Minors was renamed Directorate-General for Minors and Family.

List of officeholders
Office name:
Ministry of Social Affairs (1988–1996)
Ministry of Social Rights and 2030 Agenda (2020–present)

Notes

References

Government ministries of Spain
Social affairs ministries